The Anger Engineering Company (or A.E.C.) was an automobile company from Milwaukee, Wisconsin from 1913-1915.

History 
The A.E.C. company was founded in April 1912 by a man named Walter A. Anger. He was described as "a well-known auto tradesman". He had either T-head or L-head engines with either four or six cylinders. Most cars were built custom made. In 1915, the company went under.

Models

References

Car manufacturers of the United States
History of Milwaukee
Motor vehicle manufacturers based in Wisconsin